Numerous plants have been introduced to the US state of Pennsylvania in the last four hundred years and many of them have become invasive species that compete with the native plants and suppress their growth.

Description
Invasive species are often grouped by threat levels that vary from county to county from very high impact to remarkable increased growth. The species below are by no means comprehensive and are listed in type order rather than level of threat

The Pennsylvania Department of Conservation and Natural Resources ranks invasive species into 3 categories based on urgency of threat.

Terrestrial Plants and Trees

See also
Invasive species in the United States

References

External links
invasivespecies.gov United States Government.

Pennsylvania
Flora of Pennsylvania
Invasive plant